Love Birds is a 1996 Indian Tamil-language romance film directed by P. Vasu. The film stars Prabhu Deva and Nagma with Raja, Vadivelu and Sarath Babu playing other pivotal roles. The film's score and soundtrack composed by A. R. Rahman was highly successful. The film was released on 15 January 1996 and had an average performance commercially. The film is a remake of the 1986 Kannada film Ratha Sapthami for which P. Vasu was the co-screenplay writer.

Plot
After accidentally meeting, Mridula (Nagma) and Arun (Prabhu Deva) fall in love. The young couple both come from affluent families, and so, to test whether they will be suited for a long-term relationship, they both decide to live together. However, a few months into their relationship, Arun and Mridula get in an accident and Arun dies. A devastated Mridula is unable to get over his absence, and before long starts seeing Arun in strange visions everywhere she goes. Her family eventually decide that relocating to another country might help Mridula move on, and so they send her to the UK. Once she arrives there, she meets Mano (Raja), a young man attracted to her. She knows that her parents expect her to fall for Mano. But as she can't move on, she runs away. She meets David who looks exactly like Arun. She follows him and finds out where he lives and works. Whenever she tries to talk to him, he denies his relationship with her and says he doesn't know her. However, she later finds out that her father had Arun sent away as he had helped with Arun's sister's marriage and had threatened to let it all go downhill for her. Arun moves to the UK in hopes that he can forget about Mridula but he can't and when he meets her, he realises this. When Mridula's father finds out Arun is still alive, he tries to kill him. However, he realises his mistake and lets the lovebirds reunite.

Cast

 Prabhu Deva as Arun/David
 Nagma as Mridula
 Vijayakumar as Rathnakumar
 Sarath Babu as Prakash
 Manorama as Susheela
 Raja as Mano
 Vadivelu as Raja
 Vennira Aadai Moorthy as Professor
 Santhana Bharathi as College principal
 Raviraj as Professor
 Chinni Jayanth as Arun's friend
 Delhi Ganesh as Ramalingam
 Veera Pandiyan as Student
 H. Ramakrishnan as Susheela's husband
 LIC Narasimhan as Raghupathy
 Dhamu as Dhamu, Arun's friend
 Meena Kumari as Sheela, Arun's sister
 Vittal Rao as Vittal
 Apache Indian in a special appearance
 P. Vasu in a cameo appearance
 Vijay Sethupathi (uncredited) as a man who asks for Arun whereabouts

Production
Prabhu Deva was signed to work on the film after working in Shankar's 1994 blockbuster Kaadhalan, and his pair from that film, Nagma, was also roped in again. British Indian musician Apache Indian was also roped in to sing and dance for a music video in the film.

The film was predominantly shot across London, with scenes also canned at Buckingham Palace and at a Hilton Hotel. The producers had earlier location scouted in the city and took music director, A. R. Rahman along to get a feel of the city.

Soundtrack

The soundtrack features 5 songs composed by A. R. Rahman, his only collaboration with P. Vasu till date with lyrics by Vairamuthu for the original Tamil version, by Sirivennela Sitaramasastri for the Telugu version and by P. K. Mishra and Mehboob for the Hindi version. The album was appreciated by critics.

Tamil

Hindi

Telugu

Release and reception 
The film opened in January 1996. The film opened days earlier in Malaysia than India and was shown across 27 theaters in the country, a figure only usually exceeded for Tamil films starring Rajinikanth, and this mirrors the large release the film received. K. Vijiyan of New Straits Times gave a positive review saying, "This movie seems made for courting couples, especially those who are facing problems with disapproving parents" and added that "strong dialogue makes the film rise slight above the ordinary". Kalki called it yet another blowback for Prabhu Deva. Love Birds became an average grosser at the box office but was a little better than Prabhu Deva's next, Mr. Romeo. The actor thus had to go through a slump in his film career. The film was later dubbed and released in Telugu and Hindi under the same title.

References

External links
 

1996 films
1990s Tamil-language films
Films scored by A. R. Rahman
Films directed by P. Vasu
Indian romantic drama films
1996 romantic drama films
Tamil remakes of Kannada films